.th is the Internet country code top-level domain (ccTLD) for Thailand.

It is administered by T.H.NIC Co., Ltd. (THNIC), the corporate entity of Thai Network Information Center Foundation.

Registration
Registration of a .co.th domain name is a complicated procedure; for this reason most Thai websites prefer to use a .com name. In order to register a .co.th domain name the registrar in Thailand requires copies of company documents in the same name as the required domain name, so for example if an entity required acme.co.th the entity would need to have a registered company called Acme Co., Ltd.

A company can only register a single .co.th domain with the company name or initial name of company, and/or one .co.th domain name per trademark.

In 2018, the foundation advance to the registration for authentic using of persons (natural persons and juristic persons); therefore, the foundation reserves the right to consider and decide the number of domain names of each person on a case-by-case basis. The person who registered more than one domain name from all categories must comply with the following conditions:

All domain name registrations must comply with the criteria of domain naming and conditions as provided specified policy by categories of domain name.
The registration of domain names shall be effected in good faith by a holder of the domain name and a contact person who having a residential address or an office address in Thailand which can be contacted by THNIC.
In the case THNIC detects any unusual act in domain name registration, specifically, registration of more than one domain name, THNIC reserves the right to refuse the request or revoke the domain name immediately.

Second-level domains
THNIC admits .th registration only third-level domain under seven groups of predefined second-level domains:

Second top domain

In 2010 a new top domain was registered and introduced for Thailand, intended for domain names in the local language. As of 2011, thousands of sites with this domain are active.

It appears that the Thai second-level  domains are assigned directly to sites with English  domain names. Other groups of  domains must use third-level  domains, as in the table above.

References

External links
 IANA .th whois information
 THNIC website
 Thai Network Information Center Foundation website
  ALL Statistic Domain .TH

Country code top-level domains
Telecommunications in Thailand
Computer-related introductions in 1988
Internet in Thailand

sv:Toppdomän#T